"Ride the Lightning" is a song written by John Kongos and Peter Leroy and originally released by John Kongos in 1975.

Track listing 
7" single Cube Records BUG 58 (1975, UK)
 A. "Ride the Lightning" (4:04)
 B. "I Won't Ask You Where You've Been" (4:30)

Sylvie Vartan version (in French) 

The song was reworked into French (as "Qu'est-ce qui fait pleurer les blondes?", which means "What makes blondes cry?") by lyricist Pierre Delanoë and recorded by French singer Sylvie Vartan. The recording was produced by Jacques Revaux.

Her version was released as a single and on Sylvie Vartan's 1976 album Qu'est-ce qui fait pleurer les blondes?

The song spent two consecutive weeks at no. 1 on the singles sales chart in France (from February 19 to March 3, 1976).

Track listing
7" single (1976)
A. "Qu'est-ce qui fait pleurer les blondes?" (3:09)
B. "La Lettre" (3:17)

Charts

See also 
 List of number-one singles of 1976 (France)

References

1975 songs
1975 singles
1976 singles
Number-one singles in France
John Kongos songs
Sylvie Vartan songs
RCA Victor singles